Martin Stringari (born 9 October 1971) is a former professional tennis player from Argentina.

Career
Stringari and partner Patricio Arnold were Orange Bowl winners in 1987, for the "16 and under" age category. He also made the semi-finals of the singles and en route eliminated top seed Nicklas Kulti. At the junior Grand Slam events he made the doubles quarter-finals at the French Open in 1988 and 1989, as well as being a doubles quarter-finalist at the 1988 US Open.

He won six matches during his professional career on the ATP Tour. His biggest win came at Buzios in 1992, when he beat world number 32 Jordi Arrese, with the Spaniard retiring late in the first set, trailing 2–5.

Challenger titles

Singles: (1)

Doubles: (1)

References

1971 births
Living people
Argentine male tennis players
Tennis players from Buenos Aires
South American Games bronze medalists for Argentina
South American Games medalists in tennis
Competitors at the 1986 South American Games
20th-century Argentine people